Jerzy Władysław Giedroyc (27 July 1906 – 14 September 2000) was a Polish writer and political activist and for many years editor of the highly influential Paris-based periodical, Kultura.

Early life 
Giedroyć was born into a Polish-Lithuanian noble family on 27 July 1906, with the title of kniaź, prince. His schooling in Moscow was interrupted by the October Revolution, when he returned home to Minsk. During the Polish–Soviet War of 1919–1921 his family left Minsk for Warsaw, where he finished the Jan Zamoyski gymnasium in 1924. He went on to study law and Ukrainian history and literature at the University of Warsaw.

Career 

Giedroyć worked as a journalist and civil servant in interwar Poland, he maintained contacts with leading Ukrainians and urged the Roman Catholic Church to improve relations with the Greek Catholic Church to which most Ukrainians belonged, insisting that Poland's success as a national state depended on satisfying the aspirations of minorities so that minority nationalists would not have convincing arguments against Polish statehood. He thus took the side of Józef Piłsudski as against the National Democrats.

In 1930 he took over as editor of the weekly "Dzień Akademicki" (Academic Day) which he soon transformed into the biweekly "Bunt Młodych", renaming it Polityka in 1937.

During World War II he served under General Władysław Anders in the Polish Army and kept up friendly contacts with representatives of other nationalities. This helped to lay the groundwork for Poland's successful eastern policy after the fall of communism. His closest collaborator was Juliusz Mieroszewski, who provided the theoretical justification for Polish recognition of the borders with Ukraine, Belarus, and Lithuania (whose future independence he predicted long before it came about).

Death and awards 
He died 14 September 2000 in Maisons-Laffitte, Yvelines, Île-de-France, France.

In 2006 the Polish Sejm declared the year 2006 as the "Year of Jerzy Giedroyć".

See also 
Giedroyc Doctrine
Jerzy Giedroyc Literary Award

References

External links
Correspondences between Giedroyc and Melchior Wańkowicz Sarmatian Review September 1999
visit to Le Mesnil-le-Roi cemetery, burial place of Giedroyć and his wife, Tamara

1906 births
2000 deaths
Journalists from Minsk
Polish male writers
Polish memoirists
Recipients of the Legion of Honour
Polish opinion journalists
Jerzy
Recipients of the Order of the White Star, 5th Class
20th-century memoirists
People associated with the magazine "Kultura"